You, Me and the Apocalypse (working title Apocalypse Slough) is a British-American  comedy-drama miniseries. The series was green-lit on 8 January 2015. It debuted on Sky 1 on 30 September 2015 and on NBC on 28 January 2016. Sky 1 said in March 2016 there would be no second series.

Plot
With their days numbered, a group of people struggle with the inevitable apocalypse after it is discovered that a comet is on a collision course with Earth.

Jamie Winton (Mathew Baynton) works as a bank manager in Slough, England, living with his best friend, Dave Bosley (Joel Fry), and his adoptive mother, Paula (Pauline Quirke). Jamie vows to find his wife, Layla (Karla Crome), who disappeared seven years ago, and his biological mother before the comet hits. In one of many revelations that occurs before the comet strikes, he learns he has a twin brother named Ariel Conroy (also played by Baynton).

Meanwhile, Rhonda McNeil (Jenna Fischer) is imprisoned in New Mexico, United States, after taking the blame for a hacking crime committed against the National Security Agency by her son Spike (Fabian McCallum). There, she meets a white supremacist named Leanne (Megan Mullally).

In Washington, D.C., Rhonda's brother Scotty (Kyle Soller) and his husband, U.S. General Arnold Gaines (Paterson Joseph), are working to stop the comet that will cause the apocalypse.

At the Vatican, Father Jude (Rob Lowe) and Sister Celine (Gaia Scodellaro) work to find the potential Antichrist and the world's savior. In the end, as explained at the beginning of the series, most of these people will come to be in a bunker together under Slough as they watch the apocalypse on television.

Cast

Main
 Mathew Baynton as estranged identical twin brothers Jamie Winton and Ariel Conroy. Jamie works as a bank manager in Slough and still hopes his wife—Layla—will return after going missing seven years ago on their honeymoon. Ariel is known as White Horse, the leader of the cyber terrorist group Deus Ex Machina. They are thirty two years old.
 Joel Fry as Dave Bosley, Jamie's best friend and housemate. He later becomes married to Jamie's adoptive Mother.
 Pauline Quirke as Paula Winton, Jamie's adoptive mother.
 Rob Lowe as Father Jude Sutton, a foul mouthed, chain-smoking Vatican priest assigned to the recently reopened office of Devil's Advocate, tasked with confirming miracles and running background checks on potential saints. About 31 years ago, he abandoned the pregnant Mary Conroy. Later, she gave birth to his twin sons Jamie and Ariel.
  as Sister Celine Leonti, a young nun sent to the Vatican to work with the Devil's Advocate's office as Father Jude's partner. She falls in love with Jude, marries him in secret and in the last episode is shown to be carrying his child.
 Jenna Fischer as Rhonda McNeil, a former librarian, is now imprisoned in a New Mexico maximum security prison to protect her son, Spike.
 Kyle Soller as Scotty McNeil, Rhonda's twin brother and a minor Washington bureaucrat in the Special Situations Group. He is married to Arnold Gaines.
 Paterson Joseph as Army Major General Arnold Gaines, the United States general spearheading the efforts to either stop the apocalypse or at least have humanity's future safely secured when it does come.
 Megan Mullally as Leanne Parkins, a white supremacist in prison with Rhonda. She is married to Todd and is the mother of Junior and Jolene. She becomes friends with Rhonda after they escape prison.
 Diana Rigg as Sutton, the mother of Jude, Rhonda, and Scotty, grandmother of Jamie, Ariel, and Spike, and great-grandmother of Frankie. She is shown to be in poor health and to be estranged from all of her relatives
 Prasanna Puwanarajah as Rajesh McNeil, Rhonda's husband. He is hospitalized and terminally ill.
 Fabian McCallum as Spike McNeil, Rhonda's teenaged son and a hacker. His mother ended up in jail to protect him after he illegally hacked the NSA.
 Anastasia Hille as Mary Conroy. She gave birth to twins, first Jamie and then Ariel, and abandoned Jamie as a newborn in a cardboard box at a church car park in Slough.
 Karla Crome as Layla, Jamie's wife who disappeared seven years ago. In series 1 episode 5, Mary identified a picture as being of young Ariel with his wife, Hawkwind, whom Jamie recognized as being Layla.
 Grace Taylor as Frankie, Layla and Jamie's six-year-old daughter who (until series 1 episode 6) Jamie was unaware existed. She is later revealed to have Jude's dead voice in her head and to have the ability to supernaturally know her father.

Guest
 Nick Offerman as Buddy, a cross-dressing man in his fifties who after finding out Rhonda is a convict, holds her at gunpoint until the police arrive.
 Adam Nagaitis as Todd Jr.

Episodes
A group of people, each living their own, unconnected lives, are introduced. It is revealed that a comet is due to hit Earth in 34 days. Some of these people can be seen in a bunker together under the town of Slough, in the UK, as they watch the events unfolding up to the end of the world on TV.

Reception

The series met favourable responses from critics. On Metacritic, it holds a score of 72/100 based on 26 reviews. On Rotten Tomatoes, it holds an 83% approval rating based on 31 reviews, with an average rating of 7.4/10. The critics' consensus reads: "You, Me, and the Apocalypse has a lot of fun with the end of the world, if you can keep up with its unpredictable, oddball twists."

Production

The bunker scenes were shot at West London Film Studios on Stage 2.

References

External links
  at Sky
  at NBC
 
 

2010s American comedy-drama television series
2010s British comedy-drama television series
2015 British television series debuts
2015 British television series endings
2016 American television series debuts
2016 American television series endings
British comedy-drama television shows
Culture in Slough
English-language television shows
NBC original programming
Nonlinear narrative television series
Apocalyptic television series
Television series about impact events
Sky UK original programming
Television series by Working Title Television
Television shows set in Berkshire
Television shows set in New Mexico
Television shows set in Italy